This is a list of equipment used by the Eritrean Army.

Infantry weapons

Vehicles

Artillery

Air defense

References 

Military of Eritrea
Eritrea